Annan may refer to:

People 
 Annan (surname)

Places

Australia 
 Annan River, Queensland, a river just south of Cooktown

Canada 
 Annan, Ontario, a community within the municipality of Meaford

China 
 Annan (Tang protectorate), the southernmost province of the Tang dynasty

United Kingdom 
 Annan, Dumfries and Galloway, Scotland
 Annan Academy, a secondary school
 Annan Athletic F.C., a football club
 Annan Castle
 Annan railway station
 River Annan, Dumfries and Galloway

Taiwan 
 Annan District, in the north of Tainan City

Others 
 Annan (kata), karate kata
 Annan (film)

See also 
 Battle of Annan
 Battle of Annan Moor
 Annanhead Hill
 Annandale (disambiguation)
 RAF Annan
 
 Annan Plan for Cyprus, United Nations proposal to reunify Cyprus
 Annam (disambiguation)
 Anann, a goddess in Irish mythology